is a prominent Okinawan karate practitioner who is the founder and former Chief Instructor of the International Okinawan Goju-ryu Karate-do Federation (IOGKF). He is a holder of the highest rank in Goju-ryu karate, 10th dan. Higaonna has written several books on Goju-ryu karate, including Traditional Karate-do: Okinawa Goju Ryu (1985) and The history of Karate: Okinawan Goju Ryu (2001). Martial arts scholar Donn Draeger (1922–1982) reportedly once described him as "the most dangerous man in Japan in a real fight."

Early life
Higaonna was born on December 25, 1938, in Naha, Okinawa. He began studying Shōrin-ryū karate at the age of 14 with his father and then with his friend Tsunetaka Shimabukuro. It was Shimabukuro who recommended that Higaonna learn Gōjū-ryū karate at Chōjun Miyagi's garden dojo (training hall) in 1954, one year after the founder of Gōjū-ryū, Chōjun Miyagi's passing.  Here he's been taught by the Chojun Miyagi's third (after Seiko Higa and Meitoku Yagi) oldest student : Eiichi Miyazato. Here he also meets An'Ichi Miyagi who taught the younger students and whom Morio Higaonna recognizes as his first and main instructor in the Gōjū-ryū system.

Morio Higaonna follows Miyazato to his new Jundokan dojo, opened in 1957 and the same year he obtains the black belt from this.

In 1960, he moved to Tokyo to study at Takushoku University. On December 30 of that year, Higaonna was promoted to the rank of 3rd dan at the first all-style dan grading of the Okinawa Karate-do Renmei. He was invited to teach at Tokyo's Yoyogi dojo, where he attracted a large following of karateka (practitioners of karate). He was awarded the rank of 5th Dan in April 1966. In January 1967, Morio Higaonna Sensei received his Menkyo Kaiden (免許皆伝).

Promoting Goju-ryu across the world
In April 1967, Morio Higaonna Sensei assumed the position of karate Shihan (Teacher) in the Nihon University College of Humanities and Sciences.

In May 1968, Morio Higaonna Sensei accepted an invitation by the YMCA and traveled to Spokane in the US to conduct a series of demonstrations and lectures on the subject of karate. The trip was a success and Morio Sensei received an award from the Mayor of Spokane for his well-acclaimed efforts to promote karate in the US.

On 10 October 1970, Morio Higaonna was invited to represent Goju-Ryu Karatedo at a special demonstration, during the first World Karate Tournament organised by WUKO. This event took place in the Tokyo Budokan in Japan. Morio Sensei received a special letter of appreciation from WUKO for his demonstration.

Morio Higaonna Sensei was once again invited to demonstrate in the Third World Karate Tournament organised by WUKO in 1972. Once again Morio Sensei received a special letter of appreciation from the organisers.

In May, 1975 Morio Higaonna Sensei accepted an invitation by the French Karate Association to conduct a teaching tour in France for younger practitioners as well as for Yudansha (black-belt) practitioners. In 1977, Morio Higaonna Sensei was once again invited to teach in France by the French Karate Association.

In July 1979, Higaonna founded the International Okinawan Goju-Ryu Karate-do Federation (IOGKF) in Poole, England.  He was 7th Dan at the time, through Eiichi Miyazato.

In 1980, Higaonna married a US student, Alanna Stevens, and their son Eric was born in November that year. The family lived in Okinawa from May 1981 to May 1985, then in Tokyo from 1985 to 1987.

In 1980, the Japanese Government invited Morio Higaonna Sensei to give a special demonstration during the official state reception ceremony held in honour of the President of Mexico's state visit to Japan. The demonstration was held in Akasaka in Tokyo.

In July 1981, the IOGKF held its first World Budosai and Tournament in the Budokan in Naha-city, in conjunction with the 60th Anniversary of Naha-City's founding. (The modern city government was founded on 20 May 1921, though Naha as a port-town had existed since medieval times.).

In 1982, Morio Higaonna Sensei founded his own dojo in his own home in Naha, Okinawa. His dojo was known by the name of “Higaonna Dojo”. In the following decades, this dojo would be the port of call for many senior black belt members of the IOGKF and other schools and styles seeking to train in the traditional Okinawan way.

When the BBC (British Broadcasting Corporation) aired the documentary “Way of The warrior” in 1983, the episode on Karate featured Goju-Ryu and focused on Morio Higaonna Sensei, his training methods and his concepts on karate. The program was widely watched and very well received.

1983, Morio Higaonna Sensei began to liaise with martial-arts practitioners in the Fukien/Fujian Province of China. This was in order to research further into the history and origins of Naha-te and Goju-ryu in Fuzhou. This resulted in the first Okinawan karate seminar and demonstration ever held in Fuzhou, in 1988, and paved the way for many future exchanges between the Okinawa and Fuzhou in the following decades.

On 29 May 1984, Higaonna received his 8th dan and 9th dan promotions from Yuchoku Higa. with Higa acting in his capacity as the President of the Okinawan Karate and Kobudo Association ( 沖縄空手・古武道連盟, this is one of several umbrella organisations in Okinawa under which most Okinawan karate organisations and schools eventually became members of. The four umbrella organisations subsequently merged in 2008 to form the Okinawa Dentou Karate Shinkoukai. The IOGKF is a prominent member of this greater organisation.)

In September 1987, Morio Higaonna Sensei established the IOGKF Hombu Dojo in San Marcos, California, USA. For the next few decades, the IOGKF would continue to maintain a strong presence in North America.

In September 1987, Higaonna moved with his family to Southern California to establish a new dojo. With San Marcos as a base, he began hosting budo festivals while continuing to research, practice, and travel worldwide to teach, such as in the former Soviet Union. In 2004, Higaonna was a member of the Okinawan Karatedo and Kobudo Encyclopedia Committee.

In October 1989, under the direction of Morio Higaonna Sensei, the IOGKF held an International Karate-do Tournament in San Diego, California, USA.  An’ichi Miyagi Sensei presided over the tournament as its guest of honour.

On 8 June 1990, Morio Higaonna Sensei was invited to conduct a Budo Demonstration in New York in the UN headquarters.

On the 24th of August 1990, Morio Higaonna Sensei conducted a master's-level demonstration during the First World Okinawan Karate and Kobudo Festival. This event was organized by the Okinawan Karate and Kobudo Association ( 沖縄空手・古武道連盟). In the following decades Higaonna Sensei would continue to support this event by conducting seminars or gasshuku sessions on behalf the organizers during the festival.

On 18 October 1991, the IOGKF held a Goju-Ryu Karate Technical Seminar and All America Tournament in Arkansas in the US, with Morio Higaonna Sensei presiding over the event as the Chief Instructor and lecturer. Morio Higaonna Sensei was awarded a commendation by the Governor of Arkansas, Mr. Bill Clinton (later the President of the United States of America). The following day, the Mayor of Fort Smith, Arkansas, designated 18 October (the day on which the IOGKF seminar was held) as “Morio Higaonna Day”, and made Morio Higaonna Sensei an honorary citizen of Fort Smith City.

In February 1992, the governor of the state of Texas awarded Morio Higaonna Sensei the honorary title of Admiral of the Texas Navy in appreciation of his achievements in promoting karate in the state of Texas, US. On 2 June 1992, representatives from the office of the vice-president of the US and the state of Texas jointly presented Morio Higaonna Sensei with the title of Admiral of the Texas Navy.

In 1995, Morio Higaonna Sensei became the karate and unarmed combat instructor of the Kremlin Guard, the Police Forces and the Secret Police Forces of the Russian Federation.

In 1998, the prestigious and authoritative Nihon Kobudo Kyokai formerly recognised Okinawan Goju-ryu as a form of Japanese Kobudo, and it appointed Morio Higaonna Sensei as the representative-master of the Goju-ryu system and the IOGKF as the representative organisation within their association.

In July 1999, IOGKF held an extremely successful European Gassuku in Hamburg, Germany. At the end of the Gassuku, the Mayor of Hamburg presented Morio Higaonna Sensei with a letter of appreciation on behalf of the City of Hamburg.

In February 2000, the Chairman of the Nihon Kobudo Kyokai and Nihon Budōkan, former Minister for   Education, Culture, Sports, Science and Technology of Japan, Mr. Masajuro Shiokawa awarded Morio Higaonna Sensei a prestigious commendation for his efforts in preserving and promoting Okinawan Goju-Ryu Karatedo.

On the 31st of March 2001, The Venezuelan President presented Morio Higaonna Sensei with the Order of Vicente Emilio Sojo (A Cultural Award) for his achievements in introducing and developing karate in Venezuela.

On the 10th of February 2007, three renowned masters of karate, Morio Higaonna Sensei, Hirokazu Kanazawa Sensei and Hoshu Ikeda Sensei held a widely acclaimed karate seminar and demonstration in the Tokyo Kudan Kaikan.

On 22 June 2007, The Chairman of the Naha City Cultural Association (那覇市文化協会) awarded Morio Higaonna Sensei a commendation for his immense contribution to the preservation and development Okinawan karate.

In 2009, Higaonna took part in a CBBC show called Hai Karate Journey to Japan where four children and one of their parents from the UK went to Japan to learn karate, and had three weeks to gain their first rank promotion, to yellow belt.

On October 12, during the Euro Asia Gasshuku in Moldova, Higaonna Sensei received a special award from the President of Moldova, Nicolae Timofti, for his many years of contribution to spread traditional karate and its value to the country as well as building friendship between Moldova and Japan. It was the highest award that foreigners can receive in the country.

In July 2012 in Okinawa, Japan at the IOGKF World Budosai event. Higaonna Sensei stepped down from his position as Chief Instructor of IOGKF International. He was replaced by his successor, Sensei Tetsuji Nakamura who is now the chief instructor and chairman of the Federation, assisted by World vice-chief instructors, Sensei Ernie Molyneux and Sensei Henrik Larsen.

Higaonna Sensei's longest training and official students are among some of the best Goju-ryu instructors in the world. Sensei's Tetsuji Nakamura, Ernie Molyneux, Henrik Larsen, Bakkies Laubscher, Kazuo Terauchi to name just a few. These instructors were promoted to the IOGKF Executive Committee or advisor position by Higaonna Sensei in 2012.

On 8 May 2013, the Okinawan Government presented Morio Higaonna Sensei with an award and title recognising him as an Intangible Cultural Treasure of Okinawa, a recognition of his many years of dedication and preservation of Goju-ryu Karate, which itself was an important part of the Okinawan culture and history. A title such as this is the highest an individual may receive in Japan for the martial arts and it is only award to a handful of grandmasters in the modern history of Japan.

Higaonna currently lives in Japan and remains active in karate, teaching in his home city, in Tsuboya, Naha, Okinawa.

References

External links
 Higaonna Dojo, Naha, Okinawa
 Facebook Fan Page

 

Living people
1938 births
Karate coaches
Martial arts school founders
Martial arts writers
Okinawan male karateka
People from Naha
People from San Marcos, California
Gōjū-ryū practitioners